ATP-dependent RNA helicase SUPV3L1, mitochondrial is an enzyme that in humans is encoded by the SUPV3L1 gene.

Model organisms 

Model organisms have been used in the study of SUPV3L1 function. A conditional knockout mouse line, called Supv3l1tm1a(EUCOMM)Wtsi was generated as part of the International Knockout Mouse Consortium program — a high-throughput mutagenesis project to generate and distribute animal models of disease to interested scientists — at the Wellcome Trust Sanger Institute.

Male and female animals underwent a standardized phenotypic screen to determine the effects of deletion. 
Twenty six tests were carried out and three significant phenotypes were reported. All homozygous mutant animals died prior to birth, and therefore none were observed at weaning. The remaining tests were carried out on heterozygous mutant mice and radiography showed female animals had defects in their transverse processes.

References

Further reading

External links 
 

Genes mutated in mice